Awan Patti  (Patti Awanan) is a valley in Muzaffarabad district, Azad Kashmir, Pakistan.

Sub villages in Awan Patti

Khatpura
Kholi an 
Kayian
Bandi Siftu 
NAKAH
Babela 
Qaid Abad 
Dhara 1 
Dhara 2 
Kals Syedan
Dakhan 
Kaindlan 
Hadrian 
Nakkah 
Ratakha
Sokar
Rially
Patti 
Bandi peer baksh
sultan pur
Haripur hazara

Education

There are numerous schools, including a Government Girls High School and a similar school for boys.

Transport 
Awan Patti is well connected by road with the rest of Muzaffarabad. It has no direct train link but the nearest railway station is Rawalpindi railway station. The proposed new railway line from Islamabad to Muzaffarabad will pass through Khatpura Awan Patti on its way to Srinagar. Garhi Dupatta station will be built in Khat Pura Awan Patti.

Timber mafia 
Protected forest areas of Awan Patti are vulnerable to illegal logging by timber mafias that have coopted or intimidated forestry officials, local politicians, businesses and citizens. Clear-cutting is sometimes covered-up by officials who report fictitious forest fires. Many studies indicate large losses of forest cover to indiscriminate logging by the mafias, with over a hundred canals in the environs of Awan Patti being illegally transferred by the forest department directly to them. Besides the environmental degradation, public financial losses can be substantial.

See also

Garhi Dupatta
Jhelum Valley

References

Populated places in Muzaffarabad District